Potenza Picena is a comune (municipality) in the Province of Macerata in the Italian region of Marche, about  southeast of Ancona and about  northeast of Macerata.

Potentia was the Roman town situated in the lower Potenza valley, in the contemporary Italian region of Marche.

Geography
The bordering municipalities are Civitanova Marche, Montecosaro, Montelupone, Porto Recanati and Recanati.

The now abandoned Roman town Potentia was located along the central Adriatic Italian coast, near the modern town of Porto Recanati, in the province of Macerata.  Its original position was just north of the main Roman bed of the River Potenza (the ancient Flosis), which at present flows more than 1 km to the north.

Late Roman Potentia 
The general agreement that in Italy the late and post-Roman period saw a widespread and marked decline in town dwelling, with various Roman centres progressively abandoned and those that survived were less populous and certainly less monumental than before, also applies for Potentia. Surviving literary sources indicate that Potentia had become an episcopal seat by the beginning of the 5th century and that a bishop was present in Potentia up to the beginning of the 6th century. Although archaeological studies still have to prove the existence of a new Christian sanctuary it should be assumed that a church was built around 400. From the 4th century onwards city occupation gradually contracted. The finding of later 5th- and/or 6th-century graves in the northern part of the town implies that the city wall no longer defined a deliberate and real limit to the town. From the 6th century onwards the former urban center was gradually abandoned and dismantled, to the benefit of the nearby new towns of Recanati, Potenza Picena and later Porto Recanati.

Geography
Modern Potenza counts three frazioni: Montecanepino, Porto Potenza Picena and San Girio.

Buildings
San Francesco
Sant'Agostino
Santuario di San Girio
Chiesa degli Zoccolanti
Chiesa dei Cappuccini

People related to Potenza Picena
Renzo Tortelli, photographer.
Giordano Macellari, painter.
Ludovico Scarfiotti, Formula One and sports car driver.
Ferdinando Scarfiotti, art director.

Contemporary twin towns
 Templemore (Ireland)
 Burford (United Kingdom)

References

External links

 Official website of Comune Potenza-Picena
 General Department for the Marches 

Cities and towns in the Marche